In solid state chemistry, the fluorite structure refers to a common motif for compounds with the formula MX2. The X ions occupy the eight tetrahedral interstitial sites whereas M ions occupy the regular sites of a face-centered cubic (FCC) structure.  Many compounds, notably the common mineral fluorite (CaF2), adopt this structure.

Many compounds with formula M2X have an antifluorite structure. In these the locations of the anions and cations are reversed relative to fluorite (an anti-structure); the anions occupy the FCC regular sites whereas the cations occupy the tetrahedral interstitial sites. For example, Magnesium silicide, Mg2Si, has a lattice parameter of 6.338 Å with magnesium cations occupying the tetrahedral interstitial sites, in which each silicide anion is surrounded by eight magnesium cations and each magnesium cation is surrounded by four silicide anions in a tetrahedral fashion.

Calcium fluoride Example  
Crystallography is a powerful tool to investigate the structures of crystalline materials. It is important to understand the crystal structure of materials in order to form structure - property relationships. These relationships can help predict the behavior of crystalline materials, as well as introduce the ability to tune their properties. Calcium fluoride is a classic example of a crystal with the fluorite structure. Crystallographic information can be collected via x-ray diffraction, providing information on the locations of electron density within a crystal structure. Using modern software such as Olex2, one can solve a crystal structure from crystallographic output files.

Views of calcium fluoride crystal structure 

In calcium fluoride, the calcium cations are surrounded by fluorine anions that occupy the tetrahedral sites, with an 8:4 coordination number, fluorine to calcium. This ration is consistent with the stoichiometry of the compound, where the ratio of fluorine to calcium is 2:1. This relationship can be visualized as a cubic array of anions surrounding the calcium cations.

Extended fluorite structure 

Beyond the until cell, the extended crystal structure of fluorite continues packing in a face centered cubic (fcc) packing structure (also known as cubic close packed or ccp). This pattern of spherical packing follows an ABC pattern, where each successive layer of spheres settles on top of the adjacent hole of the lattice. In contrast, hexagonal close-packed (hcp), are successively layered with an ABAB pattern. These two types of packing are the most closely packed forms of spherical packing.

See also
 Rock-salt structure

References

Cubic minerals
Minerals in space group 225
 
Fluorine minerals
Crystal structure types